Zoeterwoude-Rijndijk is a village in the Dutch province of South Holland.

The statistical area "Zoeterwoude-Rijndijk", which also can include the surrounding countryside, has a population of around 2770.

Since 1975 a Heineken brewery is located in this town.

References

Populated places in South Holland
Zoeterwoude